The eighth season of the Syfy reality television series Face Off premiered on January 13, 2015. This season was won by Darla Edin of Minneapolis, Minnesota.

The theme this season is "Return of the Champions".  Three former winners Season 2 - Rayce Bird, Season 4 - Anthony Kosar, and Season 5 - Laura Tyler will guide teams of five to victory. In the end, Laura earned her second win on this show in this season.

Prizes for this season include US$100,000, a 2015 Fiat, and a VIP trip to one of Kryolan's makeup locations.

Recurring people
 McKenzie Westmore - Host
 Michael Westmore - Mentor

Judges
 Ve Neill 
 Glenn Hetrick
 Neville Page

The Champions / Coaches
Season 2 - Rayce Bird
Season 4 - Anthony Kosar
Season 5 - Laura Tyler

Contestants

Contestant progress

 
Color key:
 
 Contestant in Team Rayce
 Contestant in Team Anthony
 Contestant in Team Laura
 The contestant won Face Off.
 The contestant was a runner-up.
 The contestant won a Spotlight Challenge.
 The contestant was part of a team that won the Spotlight Challenge.
 The contestant was in the top in the Spotlight Challenge.
 The contestant was declared one of the best in the Spotlight Challenge but was not in the running for the win.
 The contestant was in the bottom in the Spotlight Challenge.
 The contestant was a teammate of the eliminated contestant in the Spotlight Challenge.
 The contestant was eliminated.
‡ The contestant won the Foundation Challenge

Episodes
{| class="wikitable plainrowheaders" style="width:100%; margin:auto;"
|-
|-style="color:white"
! scope="col" style="background-color: #015A52; width:12em;" |No. inseries
! scope="col" style="background-color: #015A52; width:12em;" |No. inseason
! scope="col" style="background-color: #015A52;" |Title
! scope="col" style="background-color: #015A52; width:12em;" |Original air date
! scope="col" style="background-color: #015A52; width:12em;" |U.S. viewers(million)
! scope="col" style="background-color: #015A52; width:12em;" |18-49Rating

|}

References

External links
 http://www.syfy.com/faceoff

2015 American television seasons
Face Off (TV series)